Whitton railway station is in the London Borough of Richmond upon Thames in southwest London, within Travelcard Zone 5. The station and all trains serving it are operated by South Western Railway. The station was extensively refurbished and its main buildings replaced 2015–2016. The footbridge was replaced so as to incorporate optional lifts to the platforms. Whitton station has a ticket office above the up (London-bound) platform containing a coffee shop, a taxi office, ticket machines and a disabled toilet. The station, to allow periods of no staff, lacks ticket barriers. The operator has had call at the station on most weekdays since 2014 air-conditioned, ten-coach trains. The platforms were extended away from the building and footbridge in February 2012.

Whitton is the closest station to the Twickenham Stoop rugby union stadium, home of Harlequins and is about 700 metres further by pavement from Twickenham Stadium (compared to Twickenham railway station).

History
The line through Whitton was opened by the Windsor, Staines and South Western Railway (WS&SWR) when the WS&SWR extended its line from Richmond to Datchet on 22 August 1848. In July 1850 the WS&SWR was absorbed into the London and South Western Railway (LSWR).

On 1 January 1883 the LSWR opened a curve enabling down trains from Twickenham to pass the site of what was to become Whitton station and access the Hounslow Loop. On 1 January 1923 the LSWR amalgamated with other railways to form the Southern Railway.
In the late 1920s the Southern was planning to extend its third rail electric train system from London Waterloo to Windsor & Eton (Riverside). As part of that plan new development in what was once rural areas were to receive new stations. So, from 6 July 1930 the Windsor Lines became electrified and a new station was opened called Whitton.
As today Whitton is a classic Southern structure with steel canopies and pre-cast concrete platforms.
Whitton Station survived the war unscathed and three years after the war ended, on 1 January 1948, the station and line passed into the ownership of British Railways.
In the 1980s and 1990s the station became part of Network South East and that changed due to the privatisation of the railways. Ever since the mid-1990s the franchise serving Whitton has been South Western Railway (formerly South West Trains).

In February 2015 the station started to be rebuilt. This was done in two phases – the first prior to the 2015 Rugby World Cup, and the second after that and completing in 2016. The renovation works were pencilled for completion in time for the 2015 Rugby World Cup, but completed late 2016.

Services 

Typical off-peak service from the station is:

4 tph (trains per hour) eastbound to London Waterloo, of which:
2 tph all-stations (known as "stopping")
2 tph semi-fast (calling at Twickenham, Richmond, Putney, Clapham Junction, Vauxhall and London Waterloo.
4 tph westbound of which 2 go to Windsor & Eton Riverside and 2 go back to London Waterloo via the Hounslow Loop

Typical peak-hours service from the station is:
5 to 7 tph (trains per hour) depending if to or from London Waterloo

On Sundays it is:

2 tph to London Waterloo semi-fast
1 tph to London Waterloo via Brentford
2 tph to Windsor & Eton Riverside
1 tph to Syon Lane

The service is normally provided by class 707 electric trains and class 458/5 trains.

Connections
London Buses routes 110 and H22 serve the station.

References

External links 

Railway stations in the London Borough of Richmond upon Thames
Former Southern Railway (UK) stations
Railway stations in Great Britain opened in 1930
Railway stations served by South Western Railway
Whitton, London